The spinetail devil ray (Mobula japanica), also known as the spinetail mobula ray or Japanese mobula ray, is a species of pelagic marine fish which belongs to the family Mobulidae. It is found throughout the tropical and sub-tropical waters of the Indo-Pacific and eastern Atlantic Ocean.

Taxonomy
Some analyses suggest that the species should be considered conspecific with the devil fish (Mobula mobular). It is no longer recognised as a species by the IUCN.

Description
The spinetail mobula ray is a large ray which can grow up to a maximal width of 3.1 m (average width 2.3 m).
Like most rays, it is dorsoventrally flattened and has relatively large triangular pectoral fins on either side of the main body disc. At the front, it has a pair of cephalic fins which are forward extensions of the pectoral fins. These can be rolled up in a spiral for swimming or can be flared out to channel water into the ventral mouth when the animal is feeding.

The background body coloration of the dorsal side is deep blue-mauve with a large black band stretches from eye to eye. The ventral side is white. The inner surface of the cephalic fins are silver-grey with black tips, while the outer surface and side behind eye are white.

The species can be distinguished from other large rays by its projecting head, a white-tipped dorsal fin, a spine between the base of the dorsal fin and the start of the tail, and the length of its tail. Its spiracle is just above the area where the pectoral fin meets the body.

Distribution and habitat
Little information exists about the distribution of this species. It is assumed to have a circumglobal distribution in tropical and temperate waters, both inshore and offshore and fully oceanic. The southern Gulf of California appears to be an important mating and pupping ground.

Biology
The spinetail mobula ray has a pelagic lifestyle and has been observed both alone and in groups. It feeds on zooplankton by filtering sea water.

As all Mobulidae, species is ovoviviparous. After mating, the fertilized eggs develop within the female's oviduct. At first, they are enclosed in an egg case while the developing embryos feed on the yolk. After the egg hatches, the pup remains in the oviduct and receives nourishment from a milky secretion. The pup is 70–85 cm in disc width at birth.

Conservation status
In recent years, fishing for Mobulidae has received a significant boost by price increases for their gill rakers in the market for traditional Chinese medicine. In addition to targeted catches, the species is also subject to losses from bycatch, particularly in the gillnet fishery. As such sustained losses have a high impact on a species which has a low fecundity rate, a long gestation period with only a single offspring at a time, and late sexual maturity, the spinetail mobula ray has been classified as Near Threatened by the IUCN.

References

Mobula
Fish of Japan
Pantropical fish
Fish described in 1841
Taxonomy articles created by Polbot
Taxobox binomials not recognized by IUCN